Goodwood, South Africa may refer to:

 Goodwood, North West
 Goodwood, Western Cape